Manzonia madeirensis is a species of minute sea snail, a marine gastropod mollusk or micromollusk in the family Rissoidae.

Description

Distribution
The species has been found in the Atlantic Ocean, in the Madeira archipelago.

References

maderensis
Molluscs of the Atlantic Ocean
Molluscs of Madeira
Gastropods described in 1987